Taravadee Naraphornrapat ( born 5 June 1994), formerly known as Khanittha Hongpak, is a Thai beach volleyball player. She won the gold medal at the 2021 Asian Beach Volleyball Championships.

References

External links
 
 

1994 births
Living people
Taravadee Naraphornrapat
Beach volleyball players at the 2018 Asian Games
Taravadee Naraphornrapat
Southeast Asian Games medalists in volleyball
Place of birth missing (living people)
Competitors at the 2019 Southeast Asian Games